Alfred Angula (born 7 September 1965 in Tsumeb, Oshikoto Region) is a Namibian trade unionist. In 2000, he was named the head of the Namibian Farm Workers Union (NAFWU). He became active in the trade union movement prior to independence in 1988.

Education
Angula earned a diploma in education from the University of Cape Town and matriculated at the Otjikoto Secondary School.

Expropriations
In June 2004, as head of the Farmworkers Union, Angula raised the possibility of Zimbabwe-style land expropriation, saying: If the white colleagues do not want expropriation of land, we can always introduce a new method - which is taking the land without compensation and without sharing it with them, by force.

See also
 Land reform in Namibia

References

1965 births
Living people
People from Tsumeb
Namibian trade unionists
University of Cape Town alumni
Namibian expatriates in South Africa
Agriculture in Namibia